Maryland Route 342 (MD 342) is a state highway in the U.S. state of Maryland. Known as St. Augustine Road, the highway runs  from MD 310 at St. Augustine north to unsigned MD 537 in Chesapeake City in southern Cecil County. MD 342 was constructed in its entirety by 1915.

Route description

MD 342 begins at an intersection with MD 310 (Cayots Corner Road) at the hamlet of St. Augustine. The two-lane undivided highway runs through rural areas and heads northeast, makes a right-angle turn to the northwest, curves to the west, then takes a sharp turn to the north. The state highway enters the town of Chesapeake City and intersects an unnamed road (unsigned MD 537D) that leads west to an interchange with MD 213 at the southern end of the Chesapeake City Bridge over the Chesapeake & Delaware Canal. MD 342 continues to its northern terminus at an oblique junction with George Street, which is unsigned MD 537C and leads north to the western terminus of MD 286 in the South Chesapeake City Historic District.

History
St. Augustine Road was paved as a macadam road from George Street to the right-angle turn by 1910. The remainder of the road to St. Augustine and MD 310 east of St. Augustine were constructed as a  macadam road by Cecil County with state aid by 1915. MD 342 was resurfaced with bituminous concrete in 1988.

Junction list

See also

References

External links

MDRoads: MD 342
MD 342 at AARoads.com
Maryland Roads - MD 342

342
Maryland Route 342